Shams al-Dīn Muḥammad ibn Ashraf al-Ḥusaynī al-Samarqandī was a 13th century astronomer and mathematician from Samarkand, now in Uzbekistan.

Life
Little is known of al-Samarqandi's life, who composed his most important works during the 13th and 14th centuries. He wrote works on theology, logic, philosophy, mathematics and astronomy which are important in their own right, but also provide information about the works of other astronomers.His treatise, is a discussion of dialectic reasoning as used by the ancient Greeks. He wrote Synopsis of Astronomy, and produced a star catalogue for the year 1276–1277. 

Al-Samarqandi wrote a 20-page work which discussed 35 of Euclid's propositions. In his preparation of the work, al-Samarqandi consulted the works of other Muslim mathematicians such as Ibn al-Haytham, Omar Khayyam, Al-Abbās ibn Said al-Jawharī, Nasir al-Din al-Tusi, and Athīr al-Dīn al-Abharī.

References

Sources
 
  (PDF version)

Further reading
 

Hanafis
Maturidis
1250 births
1310 deaths
Central Asia
Mathematicians of the medieval Islamic world
Astronomers of the medieval Islamic world
13th-century astronomers
14th-century Iranian people
13th-century Iranian people
People from Samarkand